Dame Helen Jayne Stokes-Lampard  (born October 1970) is a British medical academic and a general practitioner. She is Chair of the Academy of Medical Royal Colleges (AoMRC) a GP Principal and Chair of the National Academy for Social Prescribing (NASP). She was Chair of the Royal College of General Practitioners (RCGP) from November 2016 to November 2019. She is also a Professor of GP Education at Birmingham University and a visiting Chair at St George's Medical School in London.  She has a particular interest in women's health.

Early life
Helen Jayne Stokes was born in October 1970, the daughter of a headmaster. She grew up in Swansea, South Wales. She qualified in Medicine from St George's Hospital Medical School, London, in 1996 where she was President of the Students' Union.

Career

She began working at the University of Birmingham's Department of Primary Care in 2000, while she was a GP registrar. She gained a PhD in 2009. The subject of her PhD was Variation in NHS Utilisation of Vault Cytology Tests in Women post-hysterectomy. She     
was Head of Primary Care (undergraduate) in the Medical School of the University of Birmingham until becoming RCGP Chair.

She is a GP partner practising in Lichfield, Staffordshire. Prior to training as a GP, she worked in Obstetrics and Gynaecology for several years and this experience shaped her clinical and academic aspirations. She was a personal mentor for doctors in difficulty in the Midlands until 2016, a scheme supported by the West Midlands Deanery and RCGP Midland Faculty.

In 2012 she became the RCGP's first female honorary treasurer.  She was also a Governor at the Birmingham Women's NHS Foundation Trust, until October 2017.

In 2016, she was one of four candidates who stood to succeed Maureen Baker as Chair of the RCGP Council. In July, the college announced that Stokes-Lampard had been elected as the next RCGP chair, and would begin this appointment in November 2016. She became Chair of the Royal College of General Practitioners on 19 November 2016.

In 2016, in her first year as Chair of the RCGP she led policy papers on sexual and reproductive health - Time to Act and the College's first annual assessment of the GP Forward View She has spoken publicly about the adverse impacts of social isolation and loneliness on the health of the population and how it is akin to a long-term chronic condition. Her term of office as Chair of the RCGP Council ended in November 2019. She was succeeded by Professor Martin Marshall.

In October 2019, she was announced as the head of the new National Academy for Social Prescribing.

In July 2020, she became chair of the Academy of Medical Royal Colleges for three year term, succeeding Carrie MacEwen.

Honours
Stokes-Lampard was appointed Dame Commander of the Order of the British Empire (DBE) in the 2022 New Year Honours for services to general practice.

References

External links
Profile at the University of Birmingham

Living people
Alumni of St George's, University of London
Alumni of the University of Birmingham
20th-century English medical doctors
21st-century English medical doctors
British general practitioners
English women medical doctors
Fellows of the Royal College of General Practitioners
Academics of the University of Birmingham
1970 births
20th-century women physicians
21st-century women physicians
20th-century English women
20th-century English people
21st-century English women
Dames Commander of the Order of the British Empire